David Peters (born April 16, 1987) is an American professional poker player from Toledo, Ohio.  One of the most prolific tournament players of all-time, Peters' live tournament winnings exceed $40,000,000.

Poker career
David Peters declared that he started playing after seeing Chris Moneymaker win the 2003 WSOP Main Event. He looked for some online freerolls, ended up winning one of them for $600.

Since 2006, Peters has been an active and successful participant in the major poker tournament circuit both in the United States and overseas.

On the circuit, his nickname is "silent assassin".

World Series of Poker
Peters has won four World Series of Poker bracelets, the first of which came in a $1,500 No Limit Hold'em event at the 2016 World Series of Poker; he won $412,557 as a result of his victory.  His second bracelet came during the 2020 World Series of Poker Online, a special version of the World Series that was organized due to the COVID-19 pandemic.  In addition to his bracelet victories, Peters has won one World Series of Poker Circuit event, earning $86,908 and a championship ring. Across all World Series of Poker branded events, Peters has cashed a total of 70 times, with 17 final tables.

World Series of Poker bracelets

An "O" following a year denotes bracelet(s) won during the World Series of Poker Online

World Poker Tour
At the World Poker Tour, Peters has career earnings of over $2,800,000. His earnings come from nine cashes and three final tables. His best finish on the WPT came in the 2016 WPT National - Philippines $200,000 buy-in event. He finished runner-up in that tournament for a cash of $2,309,000, which is his largest cash to date.

European Poker Tour
At the European Poker Tour, Peters has five career cashes for over $600,000. He has made one final table on the EPT.

Other tournament success
On July 4, 2015, Peters scored his first career cash of at least $1 million in the $500,000 No-Limit Hold'em Eight Max tournament held at the 2015 Poker Central Super High Roller Bowl. He finished fifth in the tournament.

In June 2021, Peters won three events over a span of five days at the U.S. Poker Open, earning the series championship for the second time; he also won in 2019.

References

Living people
American poker players
World Series of Poker bracelet winners
People from Toledo, Ohio
1987 births